The NME Awards 2012 were held in London, England, on 29 February 2012, at the Brixton Academy and was hosted by English comedian Jack Whitehall. The nominations were announced exclusively on Zane Lowe's BBC Radio 1 show on 30 January 2012. Arctic Monkeys had seven nominations, followed by Kasabian, who went on to win best British Band, Lana Del Rey and Muse with three apiece.

Nominations
Winners are in bold text.

Best British Band
Arctic Monkeys
Bombay Bicycle Club
The Horrors
Kasabian
Muse

Best International Band
Arcade Fire
Foo Fighters
Justice
Odd Future
The Strokes

Best Solo Artist
Adele
Florence and the Machine
Frank Turner
Laura Marling
Miles Kane
Noel Gallagher's High Flying Birds

Best New Band
Foster the People
Lana Del Rey
Tribes
The Vaccines
Wu Lyf

Best Live Band
Arctic Monkeys
Kasabian
Muse
Pulp
Two Door Cinema Club

Best Album
Arctic Monkeys – Suck It and See
The Horrors – Skying
Noel Gallagher's High Flying Birds – Noel Gallagher's High Flying Birds
PJ Harvey – Let England Shake
The Vaccines – What Did You Expect from the Vaccines?

Best Track
Arctic Monkeys – "The Hellcat Spangled Shalalala"
Bombay Bicycle Club – "Shuffle"
Florence and the Machine – "Shake It Out"
Hurts – "Sunday"
Lana Del Rey – "Video Games"

Dancefloor Anthem
Azealia Banks – "212"
Foster the People – "Pumped Up Kicks"
Justice – "Civilization"
Katy B – "Broken Record"
Metronomy – "The Bay"

Best Video
Arctic Monkeys – "Suck It and See"
Beyoncé – "Countdown"
Hurts – "Sunday"
Lana Del Rey – "Video Games"
Tyler, The Creator – "Yonkers"

Best TV Show
Doctor Who
Fresh Meat
Misfits
Never Mind the Buzzcocks
This Is England '88

Best Festival
Bestival
Download Festival
Glastonbury Festival
Reading and Leeds Festivals
T in the Park
V Festival

Best Film
Black Swan
Drive
Harry Potter and the Deathly Hallows – Part 2
The Inbetweeners Movie
Submarine

Best Music Film
Back and Forth
George Harrison: Living in the Material World
Talihina Sky
There Are No Innocent Bystanders
Upside Down: The Creation Records Story

Greatest Music Moment of the Year
Brian May joins My Chemical Romance onstage at Reading Festival
Kasabian see in 2012 with their epic London O2 Arena show
Noel Gallagher launches his solo career with press conference
Pulp steal the show at Glastonbury with secret set
The Stone Roses reunite

Best Re-issue
Manic Street Preachers – National Treasures – The Complete Singles
Nirvana – Nevermind
Primal Scream – Screamadelica
The Rolling Stones – Some Girls
The Smiths – Complete Re-issues

Best Book
Jared Leto – Notes from the Outernet
Jarvis Cocker – Mother, Brother, Lover: Selected Lyrics
Manning Marable – Malcolm X: A Life of Reinvention
Noel Fielding – The Scribblings of a Madcap Shambleton
Shaun Ryder – Twisting My Melon

Hero of the Year
Alex Turner
Dave Grohl
Matt Bellamy
Noel Fielding
Noel Gallagher

Villain of the Year
David Cameron
Justin Bieber
Lady Gaga
Liam Gallagher
Nick Clegg

Worst album
Coldplay – Mylo Xyloto
Justin Bieber – Under the Mistletoe
Lady Gaga – Born This Way
One Direction – Up All Night
Viva Brother – Famous First Words

Worst Band
Beady Eye
Coldplay
Muse
One Direction
Viva Brother

Best Album Artwork
Arctic Monkeys – Suck It and See
Bombay Bicycle Club – A Different Kind of Fix
Björk – Biophilia
Friendly Fires – Pala
Jay-Z and Kanye West – Watch the Throne

Best Band Blog or Twitter
@Example (Example)
Frank-Turner.com/blog (Frank Turner)
@KanyeWest (Kanye West)
@LadyGaga (Lady Gaga)
@Theohurts (Theo Hutchcraft)

Best Small Festival
Field Day
Hop Farm Festival
Kendal Calling
Latitude Festival
RockNess

Most Dedicated Fans
Thirty Seconds to Mars
Arctic Monkeys
Hurts
Muse
My Chemical Romance

Hottest Male
Andy Biersack
Dominic Howard
Gerard Way
Jared Leto
Matt Bellamy

Hottest Female
Amy Lee
Florence Welch
Hayley Williams
Katy Perry
Marina Diamandis

Godlike Genius
Noel Gallagher

Outstanding Contribution to Music
Pulp

Performances

Noel Gallagher's High Flying Birds – "Everybody's on the Run", "Dream On", "Don't Look Back in Anger" 
The Horrors – "Still Life" (with Florence Welch)
Florence and the Machine – "Shake It Out"
The Vaccines – "If You Wanna"
Kasabian – "Switchblade Smiles", "Days Are Forgotten"
The Maccabees – "Pelican"
Pulp – "Mis-Shapes"

References

2012 music awards
2012 in London
2012 in British music
Culture in London
New Musical Express